Edmund Stoppard (born 16 September 1974) is an English actor. He is the son of playwright Tom Stoppard and doctor Miriam, Lady Hogg.

Life
Stoppard was born on 16 September 1974 in London, England, the son of playwright Tom Stoppard and Miriam Stoppard (née Stern), an author and physician. Both of his parents are Jewish, but he was raised in a secular household. He attended Caldicott School, and Stowe School, a boarding school in Stowe, Buckinghamshire. His parents divorced when he was 18, with his father entering into a long-term relationship with actress Felicity Kendal. He read French at the University of Edinburgh, graduating in 1997, and later trained at LAMDA.

He is married to Amie Stoppard, a niece of Terence Stamp, whom he met working behind the scenes on the film Rogue Trader. They have three daughters: Esmé, Maggie, and Evie.

His first cousin is the former politician Oona King, Baroness King of Bow and his first cousin, once removed, was politician Ted Graham, Baron Graham of Edmonton.

Career
Stoppard's film credits include appearing as one of the main characters in The Pianist, Henryk Szpilman. He also starred as the main character, Thomas, in Joy Division and as Lieutenant Addis in Nanny McPhee and the Big Bang.

In 2007, he played the title role in the BBC's drama-documentary Tchaikovsky: Fortune and Tragedy. In 2008 Stoppard returned to the stage in the Hampstead Theatre production of Amy Rosenthal's D. H. Lawrence biodrama On the Rocks, alongside Nick Caldecott and Charlotte Emmerson.

In 2010, he was cast in the role of Sir Hallam Holland in the 2010 BBC sequel to Upstairs, Downstairs. He also appeared in Any Human Heart, the Channel Four mini-series adaptation of William Boyd's critically acclaimed novel of the same name, alongside Matthew Macfadyen.

Stoppard was cast as Adrien Deume, a Swiss diplomat, Ariane's husband, in a screen version of Albert Cohen's novel Belle du Seigneur. He appeared in two television docudramas: playing Hans Litten in The Man Who Crossed Hitler, and Alan Turing in Britain's Greatest Codebreaker. Later that year Stoppard starred in British independent feature film Papadopoulos & Sons in which he played banking mogul Rob. The film was released in the UK through Cineworld on 5 April 2013. In 2013 he appeared alongside David Tennant  and Emily Watson in the BBC miniseries, The Politician's Husband. From 2017 he played King Philip IV of France in the historical fiction series, Knightfall.

He is in Brave New World, a 2020 American sci-fi dystopian drama series on the streaming service Peacock. It is an adaptation of the novel of the same name by Aldous Huxley.

Stage
Stoppard's stage credits include the title role in English Touring Theatre's 2005 Hamlet alongside Anita Dobson (which also ran at the New Ambassadors Theatre) in Shakespeare's The Merchant of Venice and Konstantin in Chekhov's The Seagull at the Chichester Festival Theatre in 2003. His West End credits include Tom Wingfield in a 2007 revival of The Glass Menagerie at the Apollo Theatre and the British premiere of Wit. He appeared in a revival of Arcadia, written by his father, at the Duke of York's Theatre in the West End in June 2009 alongside Samantha Bond and Neil Pearson. He played Valentine Coverly. In early 2012, he played the role of Peter in the Trafalgar Studios' production of the Francois Archambault play The Leisure Society.

In 2020, Stoppard appears in Leopoldstadt, a new play by his father, Tom Stoppard. The Wyndham's Theatre production is set among the Jewish community of Vienna in the first half of the 20th century and follows the lives of "a prosperous Jewish family who had fled the pogroms in the East".

Filmography

References

External links

1974 births
Living people
20th-century English male actors
21st-century English male actors
Alumni of the London Academy of Music and Dramatic Art
Alumni of the University of Edinburgh
English Jews
English male film actors
English male Shakespearean actors
English male stage actors
English male television actors
English people of Czech-Jewish descent
Jewish English male actors
Male actors from London
Stoppard family
People educated at Stowe School